Uraria picta, also known by its common name Prishniparni is a species from the genus Uraria. The species was described in 1825.

References

Desmodieae